The 2018 President's Cup was the fifth President's Cup contested for. The match was played between the champions of 2017 League of Ireland Premier Division and 2017 FAI Cup, Cork City and the runners-up of the 2017 FAI Cup, Dundalk on 11 February 2018, at Oriel Park. Cork City won the game 4-2 in a match played during snow showers.

Match

See also
 2017 FAI Cup
 2017 League of Ireland Premier Division

References

President of Ireland's Cup
President of Ireland's Cup
President of Ireland's Cup 2018
President of Ireland's Cup 2018
President's Cup